East Creek is a  tributary of Delaware Bay in Cape May County, New Jersey in the United States.

It is probably named in contradistinction to West Creek, which lies to the west, although the name of that creek is ultimately derived from the Lenape "westeconk". It rises in Belleplain State Forest, and is dammed to form East Creek Pond, which covers its convergence with Savages Run. It flows through the tidal marshes on the east side of the Stipson Island peninsula, where it is joined by Willis Run. Just below, most of its flow is diverted by Roaring Ditch into Dennis Creek, leaving only a small channel to reach the bay.

Tributaries
Roaring Ditch
Willis Run
Savages Run

See also
List of rivers of New Jersey

References

Rivers of Cape May County, New Jersey
Rivers of New Jersey
Tributaries of Delaware Bay